All Is Fair in Love and War is the debut album by Canadian Christian metal band Blessed by a Broken Heart.

Track listing

Personnel
 Hugh Charron – lead vocals
 Robbie Hart – lead guitar, backing vocals
 Tyler Hoare – rhythm guitar, backing vocals
 Simon Foxx – keyboards, additional guitar
 Frank "Da Bird" – drums
 Joel Sauve – bass

References

Blessed by a Broken Heart albums
2005 debut albums
Blood and Ink Records albums